Lisnarick is a townland of 101 acres in County Antrim, Northern Ireland. It is situated in the historic barony of Dunluce Lower and the civil parish of Ballyrashane.

See also 
List of townlands in County Antrim
Lisnarick, County Fermanagh

References

Townlands of County Antrim
Civil parish of Ballyrashane